"I Don't Want to Be a Memory" is a song written by J.P. Pennington and Sonny LeMaire, and recorded by American country music group Exile.  It was released in March 1984 as the third single from the album Exile.  The song was Exile's second number one on the country chart.  The single went to number one for one week and spent a total of fourteen weeks on the country chart.

Chart performance

References

1984 singles
Exile (American band) songs
Songs written by J.P. Pennington
Song recordings produced by Buddy Killen
Epic Records singles
1984 songs
Songs written by Sonny LeMaire